The Virginia Tax Review (VTR) is one of the oldest student-run law journals at the University of Virginia School of Law, and is the only journal at the Law School to deal exclusively with tax and corporate topics. VTR publishes three times annually. The journal is devoted to matters related to federal taxation.

History and profile
The Virginia Tax Review was founded in the Spring of 1980 by George Howell and Donald Delson, and the first issue was published in the Spring of 1981. VTR received its initial funding from Mortimer Caplin, an alumnus of the University of Virginia, who was Commissioner of Internal Revenue during the Kennedy administration and founder of the firm of Caplin and Drysdale.

As of 2007, the Virginia Tax Review ranked among the top forty of all specialty journals, and routinely published authors from top-ten law schools. At that time, it was one of the top-ranked tax law journals based on a combined score of impact, case cites, journal cites, cites/cost and currency factors. It complements the University of Virginia's highly ranked curriculum in tax law.

References

External links
Virginia Tax Review
University of Virginia School of Law
Legal Theory Blog: Tax Shelters and the Code
Tax Shelters and the Code: Navigating Between Text and Intent
Virginia Law:  Congressional Democrats May Shift Tax Policy, Say Yin, Doran
Tax Journal Rankings

1980 establishments in Virginia
American law journals
Student magazines published in the United States
Triannual magazines published in the United States
Legal magazines
Magazines established in 1980
Magazines published in Virginia
Mass media in Charlottesville, Virginia
Tax 
Publications established in 1980
Tax law journals
Law journals edited by students
Triannual journals
English-language journals